Hatsune Miku: Colorful Stage!, known in Asia as , is a Japanese mobile rhythm game developed by Colorful Palette, a studio of CyberAgent's Craft Egg, and published by Sega Corporation. The game is a spin-off from Sega's Hatsune Miku: Project DIVA series, and features Crypton Future Media's virtual singers Hatsune Miku, Megurine Luka, Kagamine Rin and Len, MEIKO, and KAITO, alongside the cast of 20 original human characters that are split into five units, each with a unique theme. Set in the real world where Virtual Singers only exist as fiction, the characters come across another world called "Sekai," where various "true feelings" are projected. The game was released for Android and Apple devices on September 30, 2020. It was developed with Unity, and uses the Piapro Studio NT engine for voice synthesis.

The game reached 5 million players as of July 2021. Sega released an English-language translated version of the game worldwide on December 7, 2021. A Traditional Chinese version for Taiwan, Hong Kong, and Macau, published by Ariel Network, was released on September 30, 2021. A Korean version released on May 20, 2022 in South Korea, published by Nuverse.

Setting 
Hatsune Miku: Colorful Stage is set in the real world, specifically in the city of Tokyo and Yokohama (both located in the Greater Tokyo Area and the Kantō region). In this game, Hatsune Miku and her friends are famous fictional singers existing in the real world as Virtual Singer. They sing songs from creators all over the world, but they also exist in  a mysterious world different from the real world that is created from a person's "true feelings", featuring various visual appearances based on the person. There are as many Sekai as there are emotions, and its form changes depending on the person's emotions. Therefore, the focus of the game is on the original characters and their journeys to find their "true feelings" with the help of the Virtual Singers.

In order to enter Sekai, one must find and play the song "Untitled." This silent song has no melody or lyrics and is created at the same time as the Sekai, and is mysteriously inserted on their devices. It can be anything, such as a game console, a smartphone, a smartwatch, a TV, a tablet, and a computer. When they play an "Untitled" song, they can travel between the real world and the Sekai. As one is able to discover their true feelings, the song will contain a playable melody and lyrics, and well as its title.

Plot 
Each of the five groups and teams has their own story, focusing on their journey to convey their "true feelings":

 Leo/need: Ichika Hoshino wishes to recover her memories with her childhood friends to make them come together again, as their friendship had become strained in the aftermath of various circumstances that occurred during middle school. She entered Sekai and met a punk-rock-styled Miku, who told her to convey her feelings to her friends and overcome their differences. Ichika and her friends eventually formed a band to restore their friendship and discover their shared memories through music.
 MORE MORE JUMP!: Minori Hanasato has always dreamed of becoming an idol. Despite having failed auditions multiple times, she never gives up and hopes to pass an audition one day. She later entered Sekai and met an idol-like Miku, who encouraged her to make her dream come true. She then formed an idol group with three former idols, who retired from their career due to problems with their agencies.
 Vivid BAD SQUAD: Kohane Azusawa has been deeply passionate about street music ever since she stumbled upon a singing session by An Shiraishi. Captivated by her singing, Kohane joined An to become a street musician as well, and later teamed up with fellow musicians Akito Shinonome and Toya Aoyagi. She entered Sekai and met a hip-hop-styled Miku, and together they began the quest to surpass a legend.
 Wonderlands x Showtime: Tsukasa Tenma had wanted to be a star since he was young to please his sister, Saki, but as time passed he couldn't remember why he had wanted to be one. He was hired to work part-time at the theme park Phoenix Wonderland, but the once-popular theater Wonder Stage he is assigned to has been deserted, unable to attract any visitors for years. There, he met Emu Otori, who desires to restore the theater to its former glory. Joined by Nene Kusanagi and Rui Kamishiro, they formed a musical theater troupe as they entered Sekai and met a clown-like Miku, hoping to revive the theater's glory and make people happy.
 Nightcord at 25:00: Kanade Yoisaki has been homeschooled and becomes reclusive because of a trauma she sustained as a result of an incident in the past. She formed an underground music circle with her three online acquaintances, communicating over a voice-chat platform named "Nightcord" and meeting at 25:00 (1AM). None of them knew each other's true names or identities, only knowing each other by online aliases and through voice chat. Kanade was pulled into Sekai by a gothic-styled Miku, who urged her to help save Mafuyu Asahina, the group's lyricist who had mysteriously disappeared a week prior.

After the introduction movie, the player must choose one of the five orbs three times. If at least two orbs have the same color, the game will automatically reveal a group (e.g. if the player picked all blue orbs, it will reveal Leo/need). However, should the player choose different color orbs, it will choose the group associated with the last color they choose.

There are three types of stories. First are group stories (or Main Stories), focusing on the backstory of one particular group, more of which become available as that group reaches higher ranks. Card Stories, on the other hand, revolve around one individual character with two parts. The first part becomes available upon acquiring the prerequisite items for the card, while the second part is unlocked by leveling up the card. There are also time-limited event stories, which are unlocked by playing the event. They are further divided into two types of stories: standalone stories focus on single groups, while mixed stories feature characters from different groups. Event stories are re-added to the game permanently 2 days after the event ended.

Characters
The characters are divided into five groups of four, each with a theme related to the groups' backstory, complete with Hatsune Miku in a thematic design to sing alongside them, and one other Virtual Singer (with the exception of Vivid BAD SQUAD, who have three, and Nightcord at 25:00, who only have Miku). As the game's story progresses, new versions of each Virtual Singer appear in the different Sekai. Currently, in the Japanese version of the game, each Sekai has a version of every Virtual Singer except KAITO, who is only yet to appear with Nightcord at 25:00.

Leo/need
An all-girl pop-rock band formed by a group of childhood friends who have learned to overcome their differences. Their Sekai consists of a classroom bathed in the afterglow of the sunset. They are initially supported by Hatsune Miku and Megurine Luka, who take on the form of band musicians. Their image color is Midnight Blue, and they represent memories.

Ichika is the vocalist and guitarist of the band. Her name comes from how her parents met each other, "an encounter made because of one certain song". While appearing cool on the outside, she is actually a worrywart, especially when it comes to her childhood friends. She currently attends Miyamasuzaka Girls Academy in class 1-C and is the class president. She is a big fan of Hatsune Miku. Ichika was the first among her friends to discover the track "Untitled", which she found on her phone. Ichika also appears in the game's promotional art more often than the other original characters.

Saki is the keyboardist of the band. She was hospitalized during her elementary and middle school days and was discharged during the first year of high school, only to find out that her childhood friends had grown apart. Along with Ichika, the two attempt to reunite the remaining two by forming a band, just like during their elementary school days. She suffers from an unspecified chronic disease that could potentially threaten her life and has caused her frequent hospitalizations. Saki aims to make the most of her time with her friends and make up for all the time she spent in the hospital. She has an older brother named Tsukasa, who is very protective of her and has been looking after her ever since she fell ill.

Honami is the drummer of the band, and acts as the motherly figure of the group. During middle school, she was afraid of being isolated by her classmates, who accused her of being "two-faced" for siding with everyone. She decided to distance herself from her childhood friends and hang out more with her classmates instead. She later realized she had been running away from them in order protect herself. Honami loves apple pie and often buys it in bulk, something she considers embarrassing. She also seems to be bad at drawing, but is a good swimmer. She has a part-time job as a cleaner at Kanade Yoisaki's house and has been making sure Kanade is getting proper nutrition.

Shiho is the bassist of the band. She also works part-time at a live house and sometimes fill-in a bassist position. At the beginning of the unit's main story, she distanced herself from others so her friends would never get caught in the bad rumors about her. However, Shiho actually wanted to be reunited with her friends again. She is stoic and rarely smiles, but has quite a liking of the mascot of Phoenix Wonderland. She has an older sister named Shizuku, whose overly-attached behavior annoys her. She is at Class 1-A of Miyamasuzaka Girls Academy and is also classmates with Minori Hanasato and Kohane Azusawa.

MORE MORE JUMP!
A pop idol group formed by one girl who dreams of becoming an idol and three girls who have quit being idols. Their Sekai consists of a concert stage illuminated by countless glow sticks. They are initially supported by Hatsune Miku and Kagamine Rin, who take on the form of idols. Their image color is Bright Green, and they represent hope.

A clumsy yet easy-going first year high school student who is often hit by bad luck, but never gives up and continues to work hard with a single-minded heart. Minori is a big fan of the now-disbanded idol group "ASRUN", and idolizes Haruka Kiritani in particular. She hopes to become an idol herself, despite having failed every audition she has taken. She has a pet dog named "Samo".

A very popular idol who was once a member of the nationally famous idol group "ASRUN". The group suddenly disbanded, forcing Haruka to retire from the entertainment industry. Her hobby includes collecting penguin-related merchandise. She is the childhood friend of An Shiraishi, with whom she has had a friendly-rivalry relationship.

A retired idol who used to appear often in a variety show as the persona "Happy Everyday". She is the middle child of her family and lives with her househusband father and two sisters. Her hobbies include idol research and shopping. She's the childhood friend of Ena Shinonome. She acts as the straight man of the unit.

An elegant but airheaded high school sophomore. Formerly of the group "Cheerful*Days", she drew jealousy from her fellow idol unit members due to perceived favoritism. Unable to see any worth in continuing it, she quit her idol career. She is clueless about technology, as she has a habit of causing an electronic device to break down, and has a poor sense of direction. Shizuku greatly loves her younger sister, Shiho, and dotes on her constantly.

Vivid BAD SQUAD
A top-level hip-hop, teen pop, electronic and street music group formed to surpass a legend. They were originally two separate musical duos before their merger: Vivids and Bad Dogs. Their Sekai consists of an alleyway with walls covered in graffiti and concert posters. They are initially supported by Hatsune Miku, who takes on the form of a street dancer, alongside MEIKO, who takes on the form of a café waitress, and Kagamine Len, who takes on the form of a disc jockey. Their image color is Vivid Red, and they represent passion. 

A shy first year girl who lacks self-confidence. She became interested in music after watching An perform at a live music café. The two later formed the unit "Vivids" to perform at different events. Kohane also enjoys photography and usually looks after her father's pet snake. 

An is the outgoing and lively daughter of Ken, one of the artists headlining the "RAD WEEKEND" event. She used to sing solo at events and on the street, until she met Kohane and asked her to be her singing partner. She can get hotheaded at times, but is generally very cheerful. An is a first-year student at Kamiyama High School, where she is also a hall monitor.

, Reina Aoyama (child)
Akito usually appears to be a well mannered boy, but underneath is his brash and rough side, unafraid to say what's on his mind. He was inspired to get into music by Ken, An's dad, and aspires to surpass his "RAD WEEKEND" event one day. Akito formed the group "BAD DOGS" with Toya, which then combined with An and Kohane's "Vivids". He has an older sister named Ena, with whom he has a bit of a rocky relationship. 

Toya is the reserved youngest son of a famous classical musician, who had him learn classical music from a very young age. Against his father's wishes, Toya formed the street music group "BAD DOGS" alongside Akito. Toya looks up to Tsukasa Tenma, whom he's known from a young age and respects, because Tsukasa gave him the courage to give up classical music. He is very good at crane games, and usually gives his prizes to Akito or Tsukasa as a gift for their sisters.

Wonderlands x Showtime
 is an eccentric musical theater troupe formed to "put a smile on people's faces to make the world happy". Their Sekai consists of an amusement park filled with fantastical encounters like singing flowers and walking stuffed animals. They are supported by Hatsune Miku, who takes on the form of a cat-like troupe jester, and KAITO, who takes on the form of a suited troupe actor. Their image color is Pop Yellow, and they represent happiness.

The troupe leader of Wonderlands x Showtime, Tsukasa is a self-absorbed and enthusiastic high school sophomore who aims to be a star to make people smile. He is working part-time at theme park Phoenix Wonderland's Wonder Stage and aims to become the world's future star. He has a positive relationship with his younger sister, Saki, who was the catalyst for his goal of becoming a star that makes people smile. 

A cheerful and free-spirited girl, her family has the ownership of Phoenix Wonderland. She has been determined to keep the theme park's Wonder Stage theater running, so as to preserve her late grandfather's legacy. She has a habit of slipping onomatopoeia in her speech, to the point of becoming a whole language itself, called Emu-language. She is the youngest daughter in her family, and has an older sister and two older brothers. Outside of Wonderlands x Showtime, Emu is classmates with Honami Mochizuki and is acquainted with Mafuyu Asahina, whose smile frightens her.

 

A shy and introverted girl who is experienced in stage performances, but suffers with stage fright, leaving her unable to sing during a stage performance. Despite her shy personality, she can be very blunt and sharp-tongued, especially towards her group members. She enjoys video games and is highly skilled at them. Nene ends up becoming friends with Ichika Hoshino due to their similar personalities.

Nene's childhood friend who has an interest in directing. He is considered a genius, but also overly-eccentric. His hobbies include creating robots and other inventions to use in shows. One of his notable creations is RoboNene, a Mikudayo-lookalike robot with an appearance similar to Nene, made specifically to assist her in stage performances. During middle school, Rui was a social outcast, and many others looked down at him due to his unusual and potentially dangerous ideas, although he did manage to befriend fellow outcast Mizuki Akiyama.

Nightcord at 25:00
 is an indie underground music circle whose identities are shrouded in mystery. Each of the group's members have expressed thoughts of "wanting to disappear". Their Sekai consists of an empty space with nothing in it except for a few dim rays of light and distorted screens. The only singer to accompany them at game launch is Hatsune Miku, who is mysterious in her personality as well as gothic appearance, though this changes later on. Their image color is Dark Purple, and they represent trauma. Nightcord refers to the online voice-chat platform the group use, similar to the real-life chat platform Discord.

The composer of the circle who goes by the internet name "K". Kanade is a hikikomori who always wears a jersey and is currently homeschooled. Her father was also a music composer, who fell ill of an occupational stress and was hospitalized due to the sense of being compared to his daughter. This event traumatized Kanade and led her to vow to "make a song that can save people".

The lyricist of the circle, known by the internet name "Yuki". Pressed into fulfilling the expectations of others, especially her mother, Mafuyu lost sight of herself and her emotions. She puts up a "good girl" facade around other people, but reverts to her real, somber self in front of her group members. Outside the circle members, only Emu Ootori seems to be aware of this.

The artist of the circle going by the internet name "Enanan", Ena is the one behind the illustrations for the circle's music video. She likes to post her selfies to social media to gain likes, but actually suffers from inferiority complex. Believing she has no talent in painting, she is so pessimistic that she always thinks people would come to make fun of her artwork. She is harsh and easily gets angry, especially towards Mafuyu, but is still generally nice and cares for others. Ena is Akito's older sister, who she has a rocky relationship with.

Mizuki is the video editor of the circle's music videos, known by the internet name "Amia". They are playful and enjoy teasing their group members, particularly Ena. Despite their outwardly cheerful personality, Mizuki is said to have a "secret" deliberately left unknown to fellow circle members as well as the audience. Mizuki enjoys designing clothes in their free time and has an obsession with anything cute. For unexplained reasons, Mizuki's gender is currently listed as "unknown" in official sources. They are considered an outcast by other people in their school and were depicted with shorter hair and a boys' school uniform in flashbacks. Mizuki later became friends with Rui Kamishiro since they both see themselves as outcasts.

Other characters
Side characters that makes their appearance in the groups' main and event stories.

Leo/Need related characters
  and : Members of a professional band called Standout. They are the ones who inspired Leo/Need to aim for professional debut.

More More Jump! related characters
 : An idol who used to perform with "ASRUN", which she joined after passing an audition. She did so because she claimed she had always wanted to perform with Haruka.
She is currently an online streamer with around 800,000 subscribers. She helped promote More More Jump! via a live streaming video.

Vivid Bad Squad related characters
 : An's father, he is a semi-active musician who has held the legendary performance "Rad Weekend". He was the one who inspired both An and Akito to become street musicians. He is currently running a live cafe & bar called "Weekend Garage". His wife is a school teacher who seems to be bad at cooking.
 : A street musician and an acquaintance of Bad Dogs. He respects Ken, but thinks his daughter An doesn't have talent and is just using her father's popularity. He sabotaged the Vivids' first live performance and created an "opportunity" for Vivids and Bad Dogs to confront each other. He was referred to only as "Musician" in the group's main story until his name was revealed in the event story "Stray Bad Dogs".
 : Touya's estranged father, Harumichi is a 53-year-old classical musician. He has been teaching Touya and his two older brothers on the path of classical music. Touya's decision to switch to street music enraged him.
 : A 19-year-old street performer who has been performing all by himself after his partner had an accident and subsequently retired from performing. He becomes a rival to Vivid Bad Squad.

Wonderlands x Showtime related characters
 : A cast of Phoenix Wonderland, he is in charge of taking care of Emu. He's always seen wearing an animal-themed mascot costume, hence his nickname.
 : The haughty lead singer of the rival Phoenix Stage troupe. She often makes fun of Wonderlands x Showtime, especially Nene. But upon learning of the current state of the park, she decided to hold a performance with Wonderlands x Showtime.
 : The family owner of Phoenix Wonderland. The family consists of the father , the oldest son , the younger son , the older daughter , and the youngest daughter Emu. Both sons currently work as theme park managers, while the older daughter is currently attending college.
 : The CEO of Riley Entertainment, a large company that manages the world-famous character content IP. He was interested in making a business partnership with Phoenix Wonderland and desired to help make the theme park more popular, but decided to keep it as it is after seeing Wonderlands x Showtime's show that utilized the entire theme park.

Gameplay 
Colorful Stage gameplay consists of tapping notes as they slide toward the bottom to the rhythm of a chosen song; players have to tap, slide and flick to match new free-form rhythm notes, and special yellow notes that are worth more points towards your score. The overall gameplay is similar to Sega's Persona Dancing (Atlus), Chunithm and Bandai Namco's The Idolmaster series, the players are given 1,000 health points to clear a song, and one can adjust song speed and difficulty to their liking. In lieu of an energy system that is prevalent in most free-to-play games, Hatsune Miku: Colorful Stage utilizes Live Boosts that increases rewards for completing a song, and players can continue playing even when they run out of boosts.

Players gain experience points (EXP) by clearing songs and listening to overworld conversations between characters. Such talks are fully voiced with 2.5D movement via Live2D technology, and their conversations are depicted in a visual novel-style presentation that is prepared for each group, including the Virtual Singers such as Miku. Further dialogues are added over time through events. EXP also improves a unit's rank, which unlocks additional chapters in group stories. Cards, which use a star ranking system to determine rarity (four stars being the rarest), are acquired via the gacha system, a luck-based mechanic in which players spend the in-game currency Crystals with the hope of winning their desired cards. Although Project Sekai is a free-to-play game, players can spend real-life money to acquire more crystals.

The game also features Virtual Lives, a mode where players can go to a virtual concert, similar to augmented reality or a Vocaloid live concert, where players can interact with one another. They can see other players all around the world and their favorite group performing via 3D animation.

Song list 

The game initially launched with 28 songs, with around four new songs added per month to the game; as of December 2021, a total of 146 songs are included. The tracklist mainly consists of Vocaloid songs, with most songs having two versions: the original version (named "Virtual Singer version" in-game), and Sekai versions, having the song covered by the original characters, and sometimes joined by a Virtual Singer. Some songs also have a 3D MV or animated MV, with animated MVs either being newly created for the game (named "2D MV" in-game) or original. Songs without an MV are played with a static 2D background.

Commissioned songs

Pre-existing songs

Development 
The game was first announced on August 30, 2019, at Magical Mirai 2019. The development is done by the Colorful Palette, a newly established subsidiary of Craft Egg (who is already known for another rhythm game: BanG Dream! Girls Band Party). Yuichiro Kondo, the first producer of Girls Band Party, also serves as the producer for this game. The project started in 2017 and was initially being developed entirely by Craft Egg, but Kondo thought it was necessary to avoid a situation where the project would clash with the development of Girls Band Party, so he created Colorful Palette with Craft Egg's core members within the company.

The title is a rhythm game that features arrangements of songs made by various artists over the years using the Vocaloid software. The original story of the game is told in a visual novel and musical film-style. The direction of the game's design and concept is different from other Hatsune Miku-related games, such as Sega's Hatsune Miku: Project DIVA, where the player and Hatsune Miku face each other directly and communicate in the game. The project is said to be "a work that embodies the existence of Hatsune Miku" and explores the relationship between music and people. One of the reasons behind this format was the idea of "wanting the younger generation to listen to more Vocaloid music and other songs from the internet." Therefore, while knowing that there could be people opposed to the idea of addition of original characters, it was decided to develop such a setting. The series's concept was also borrowed from Persona 5, albeit much more lighthearted tone.

Release 
The game's pre-registration was originally set to begin in late April, but was delayed until further notice due to the COVID-19 pandemic. The pre-registration later started on July 17, 2020, and Sega revealed the goals were set from 100,000 to 1,000,000 pre-registrations. In September 2020, the pre-registrations later reached 1,000,000 and players who pre registered received rewards.

The game's worldwide release was announced in August 2021 with a slightly different title, Hatsune Miku: Colorful Stage!. Nuverse released the game for the Hong Kong, Macau, and Taiwan markets on September 30, 2021. Nuverse is also managing the release in Mainland China, South Korea, and Southeast Asia, with a release date to be announced. Sega released the game for all other regions (especially Western world including Oceania, Europe and North America) on December 7, 2021.

Music

Singles 
The original songs specially commissioned to famous Vocaloid producers for each units. The albums are licensed under Bushiroad Music. It's also available worldwide through online music streaming services, such as Spotify, Amazon Music, and Apple Music.

Albums 
Collections of cover songs from each unit.

Other media

Anime series
A mini anime series titled  was announced during the game's first anniversary live stream. The mini anime series will have 10 episodes that will be broadcast through Tokyo MX and is available for free to watch through the game's official YouTube channel. The anime will have the characters drawn in chibi-style, and a bit of gag-esque story that is slightly different from the original story. It premiered on January 13, 2022. Official English subtitles are made available some time after the official premiere.

Episodes

Printed media
An anthology comic was released on November 25, 2021, by Ichijinsha's DNA Media Comics. The manga collection are drawn by 15 different artists with their own depiction of the game, hence its content may not count as canon. An official visual fan book was released on November 26, 2021.

Reception
, Project SEKAI has reached over 5 million users and received positive reviews. The game was ranked 9th on Twitter's Most Talked About Video Games list in 2021.

Controversy 
On February 17, 2022, episode 6 of the Petit Sekai mini anime, titled Leo/need Style, premiered on YouTube. Due to a scene where the characters had darkened skin tones, wore dark make-up, and wore costumes that were similar to stereotypical African tribal outfits (a possible homage to gyaru or ganguro fashion), Sega was accused by some English-speaking viewers of blackface and cultural appropriation. The next day, the episode was withdrawn indefinitely and a public apology in both English and Japanese was uploaded to the official Project Sekai Twitter account. The episode was reuploaded to YouTube on March 15, 2022, with modifications to remove the tan, makeup and tribal items.

On October 21, 2021, the event Revival my dream was released on the Japanese servers of the game. This event sparked controversy among English-speaking viewers on social media due to the cards’ costumes portraying perceived racial stereotypes of Native Americans and a character in the event describing “forest dwellers” as “barbaric”, which some people took as racist or colonialist towards Native Americans. Due to this, the event was skipped in the English server. Players defending the event have stated that it was intended to be a reference to the movie Princess Mononoke, and that the story was about overcoming racial prejudice.

Real life events

Concert 
Currently, the game has held two types of live concerts: Sekai Symphony and Colorful Link.

Sekai Symphony 
Sekai Symphony is an annual orchestra concert for the songs that has been featured in the game. It is held annually held at Pacifico Yokohama and is performed by Sekai Symphony Special Band of Tokyo Philharmonic Orchestra. The first concert, held on October 16, 2021 featured Tsukasa Tenma and Nene Kusanagi's voice actors Daisuke Hirose and Machico as guests. The second concert was held on June 11, 2022 featured the voice actresses of Nightcord at 25 (Tomoki Kusunoki, Rui Tanabe, Minori Suzuki, and Hinata Sato) as guests

Colorful Live 
.A live concert featuring characters from the game in hologram, 3D model that is different from the one seen in the game. It follows the nature of Magical Mirai, an annual Miku-centered live concert, where all of the 26 characters (20 original characters + 6 Virtual Singers) will sing and dance along with real life band performers. The first concert, titled Colorful Live 1st -Link- was held on January 28-30, 2022 at Makuhari Messe. There was also paid live stream held on Abema TV.

Tournament 
Project Sekai Championship (プロジェクトセカイ Championship) is the annual tournament of the game Project Sekai: Colorful Stage organized by SEGA. As of November 2022, SEGA has hosted a total of 4 tournaments of the Project Sekai game title. This is also the place to introduce new songs that are expected to be added to the game in later date.

The following is a list of tournaments organized by SEGA:

 RAGE Project Sekai Championship 2020 Winter (RAGE プロジェクトセカイ 2020 Winter): Held from November 22, 2020 to December 13, 2020 (Sponsored by RAGE Esports and Sharp Aquos)
 Project Sekai Championship 2021 Autumn (プロジェクトセカイ Championship 2021 Autumn): Held from August 21, 2021 to September 26, 2021
 Project Sekai Championship 2022 Spring (プロジェクトセカイ Championship 2022 Spring): Held from February 26, 2022 to April 30, 2022 (Sponsored by Weiß Schwarz and Cup Noodle)
 Project Sekai Championship 2022 Autumn (プロジェクトセカイ Championship 2022 Autumn): Held from September 15, 2022 to November 26, 2022 (Sponsored by Weiß Schwarz and Shibuya Scramble Figure)

See also
BanG Dream! Girls Band Party! — Game developed by Craft Egg, parent company of Colorful Palette
Crypton Future Media
Vocaloid

Notes

References

External links
 
Worldwide Official website 
Traditional Chinese Official website 
Petit Sekai at Tokyo MX 

2020 video games
Android (operating system) games
Anime and manga controversies
Dance video games
Gacha games
Free online games
Free-to-play video games
IOS games
Japan-exclusive video games
Music video games
Party video games
Science fiction video games
Video games about video games
Video games about virtual reality
Video games based on musicians
Video games developed in Japan
Video games featuring female protagonists
Video games set in Japan
Video games set in Tokyo
Video games set in Yokohama